Ulmus Sapporo Gold 2  is an elm cultivar raised by the Wisconsin Alumni Research Foundation (WARF), United States, but only registered and released to commerce in Europe.

Description
Very vigorous and rather unruly, maintaining a clean stem has proven difficult, effectively disqualifying 'Sapporo Gold' for street use, consequently it is now promoted primarily as a hedgerow tree. The foliage is similar to 'Sapporo Autumn Gold', which has the same parentage.

Pests and diseases
'Sapporo Gold 2' has a high resistance to Dutch elm disease.

Cultivation

Accessions

Europe
Sir Harold Hillier Gardens, Ampfield, Hampshire, UK. Acc. no. 1991.0891 (listed simply as 'Resista'), single tree planted in Crookhill Field (CK 130), 6.6 m high, 19.0 cm d.b.h. in 2005.

Nurseries
André Briant Jeunes Plants , Saint-Barthélemy-d'Anjou, France
Pepinieres Minier , les Fontaines de l'Aunay, France

References

Hybrid elm cultivar
Ulmus articles missing images
Ulmus